Thiruverkadu (literally 'a forest of holy herbs and roots') is a Western suburb of Chennai, Tamil Nadu. It comes under Thiruvallur district administration. It is famous for its Devi Karumariamman Temple.  There is also Vedapureeswarar Temple in Thiruverkadu, where Lord Shiva and Goddess Parvathi are seen in their wedding pose inside the sanctum sanctorum. As of 2011, the town had a population of 62,289. It is a town with rich cultural heritage and also a fast-growing areas in the city. 

Thiruverkadu Selection  Grade Municipal town in Thiruvallur District is Located at a very close proximity to Chennai mega city. This town possesses the appearance and Character similar to many of the town in Tamil Nadu which bears the seal of Religion.The famous temple in this town is devoted to Lord Sri Devi Karumariamman Temple and Lord Siva Temple. This Temple on each new moon day attract a large number of people from all around. It is the nucleus for the development of this town and present development pattern has emerged from a small village at the beginning of 50 years. Thiruverkadu town was constituted as a Municipality from 2004 onwards, Thiruverkadu is functioning as a grade III Municipality with 28.50 Sq.Km in extent.

This town consists of four revenue villages namely Thiruverkadu, Numbal, Sundarasozhapuram, Veeraragavapuram, Ayanambakkam, Perumalagaram and Koladi. The town is divided into 18 wards. Thiruverkadu town is located at a distance of 16 km west of Chennai City. This lies on Chennai-Bangalore National Highway Road and Chennai Thirupathi Trunk road. It is situated 13 9” North latitude and 79 55” E longitude. The present extent of this town is 10.75 Sq.km.

Demographics
According to 2011 census, Tiruverkadu had a population of 62,824 with a sex-ratio of 977 females for every 1,000 males, much above the national average of 929. A total of 7,189 were under the age of six, constituting 3,617 males and 3,572 females. Scheduled Castes and Scheduled Tribes accounted for 22.86% and 0.37% of the population respectively. The average literacy of the town was 74.35%, compared to the national average of 72.99%. The town had a total of 15,863 households. There were a total of 25,245 workers, comprising 138 cultivators, 210 main agricultural labourers, 628 in house hold industries, 21,770 other workers, 2,499 marginal workers, 57 marginal cultivators, 81 marginal agricultural labourers, 156 marginal workers in household industries and 2,205 other marginal workers. As per the religious census of 2011, Tiruverkadu (M + OG) had 93.17% Hindus, 1.36% Muslims, 4.98% Christians, 0.04% Sikhs, 0.05% Buddhists, 0.04% Jains, 0.33% following other religions and 0.03% following no religion or did not indicate any religious preference.

Location 

The town is located 2 km from Chennai-Bangalore highway NH4 and 1.5 km from Avadi Poonamalle road SH55. The town is 10 km from Chennai Metropolitan Bus Terminus CMBT. Nearby towns include Porur, Kattupakkam, Iyyapantangal, Kumananchavadi, Karayanchavadi, Poonamalle, Paruthipattu, Ayapakkam, Ambattur, Vaangaram and Maduravoyal.

Administration 
Thiruverkadu is governed by Municipality of Thiruverkadu, coming under the Thiruvallur district.  Thiruverkadu is selection grade Municipality. Thiruverkadu Municipality includes area of Thiruverkadu, Koladi, Ayanambakkam, Velapanchavadi, Veeraraghavapuram, and Noombal. Thiruverkadu Municipality is situated in the West Chennai of Tamil Nadu in Thiruvallur District. This town is surrounded with infrastructural facilities and it is near to visit Chennai Metropolitan Bus Terminal. The town's police comes directly under Chennai Metropolitan Police departments(Now comes under Avadi).

RTO: Thiruverkadu comes under RTO-Poonamallee (TN-12). Previously it was under Tiruvallur RTO (TN20).

Transport

Bus 

Thiruverkadu is easily accessible from most parts of the city by bus. The Thiruverkadu bus terminus  provides services to Tnagar, Tambaram, Vadapalani, Iyapantangal, Ambattur Estate, Villivakkam, Perambur, Vallalar Nagar, Thiruvotriyur, Broadway, Anna square, Mangadu, Velachery, Avadi.

Via Thiruverkadu

Educational institutions

Schools 
 Government higher secondary schools
 Government primary schools
 The Pupil Saveetha Eco School
 RMK CBSE School
 Sri Annai Vidhyashram Matric Higher Secondary School
 Ramakrishna Vidya Niketan higher secondary school
 S.K.D.J higher secondary school
 Saraswathi matriculation higher secondary school
 Maharishi School of Excellence Senior Secondary
 Janet Matriculation school

Colleges 
 S.A Engineering College
 S.A Polytechnic College
 Mahalakshmi College Of Arts and Science
 Sindhi College Of Arts and Science
 Shenbaga Nursing College
 Gayathri General Hospital And College
 ACS Medical College and Hospital
 Saveetha Dental University
 Saveetha law college

Temples 

 There are Two big temples and many small temples are located in Thiruverkadu. The main temples are SriDevi Karumariamman Temple which is located at the center of thiruverkadu and very near from thiruverkadu Bus stand.
 Sri Vedapureeswarar Temple is another big temple where Lord Shiva is the main god which located one kilometre from thiruverkadu Bus stand (near cooum river bank).

Hospitals 
 Rotary club clinic, sannathi street
 Gayathri hospital, Mgr nagar
 Abhishek hospital
 Government primary health centre, veeraraghavapuram
 Saveetha Dental University, Velappanchavadi
 ACS Medical College and Hospital, Velappanchavadi
 Dr Mehtha's hospital, Velappanchavadi
 Aravind eye hospital

References

Neighbourhoods in Chennai
Hindu temples in Chennai